is a Quasi-National Park in Kyoto Prefecture, Japan.

Administration
Like all quasi-national parks in Japan, the park is managed by the local prefectural governments. Kyoto Tamba Kogen Quasi-National Park is administered by Kyoto Prefecture.

Gallery

See also

 National Parks of Japan

References

 京都丹波高原国定公園　Kyoto Tamba Kogen Quasi-National Park
 

National parks of Japan
Parks and gardens in Kyoto Prefecture
Protected areas established in 2016
2016 establishments in Japan